The nucleus raphe magnus (called the nucleus raphes magnus by Terminologia Anatomica and some scientific publications), is located directly rostral to the nucleus raphe obscurus, and receives input from the spinal cord and cerebellum.

This makes the nucleus raphe magnus a likely candidate for part of the motor system; however, it seems to participate in the endogenous analgesia system. Mounting evidence suggests that the nucleus raphe magnus plays an important role in homeostatic regulation.

The nucleus raphe magnus receives descending afferents from the periaqueductal grey matter (PAG), the paraventricular hypothalamic nucleus, central nucleus of the amygdala, lateral hypothalamic area, parvocellular reticular nucleus and the prelimbic, infralimbic, medial and lateral precentral cortices.

All of these brain areas influence the main function of the nucleus raphe magnus.

The main function of the nucleus raphe magnus is mostly pain mediation; in fact it sends projections to the dorsal horn of the spinal cord to directly inhibit pain. The nucleus raphe magnus releases serotonin when stimulated. Raphe-spinal neurons project to enkephalin releasing interneurons in the posterior horn of the spinal cord.

The periaqueductal grey matter, an area of the brain involved in mediating analgesia, sends efferent connections to the nucleus raphe magnus when it is stimulated by opiates (endogenous or otherwise).

Electrical stimulation of the PAG produces analgesia, as well as administration of morphine to the PAG or nucleus raphe magnus. The antinociceptic effects of electrical stimulation of the PAG can be blocked by administering naloxone, an opiate antagonist, to the nucleus raphe magnus.

Similarly, afferent fibres from the spinothalamic tract synapse at the periaqueductal grey matter. This in turn is linked to the nucleus raphe magnus, which when stimulated directly inhibits pain fibers in the dorsal horn of the spinal cord, thus alleviating pain.

All of this seems to indicate that the nucleus raphe magnus is part of the endogenous opiate system, and acts to inhibit pain in the spinal cord.

See also
 Raphe nuclei

References

Medulla oblongata
Serotonin